Música en Compostela (Music in Compostela) is an annual summer course in music performance and composition held in Santiago de Compostela, Spain. It was founded by the Spanish guitarist Andrés Segovia and the diplomat José Miguel Ruiz Morales in 1958. The goal of the founders was to foster the appreciation of Spanish classical music and give students from both Spain and abroad the opportunity to study under some of the country's most prominent musicians and composers. Segovia's masterclasses at Compostela, like those at the Accademia Musicale Chigiana in Siena, were considered "a virtual necessity for aspiring guitar virtuosos." Over the years, composers Óscar Esplá, Federico Mompou, Xavier Montsalvatge, and Joaquín Rodrigo, pianist Alicia de Larrocha, and singers Victoria de los Angeles, Montserrat Caballé and Conchita Badía have also taught courses there.

References

Sources
Debén, Carmen, El Hostal de los Reyes Católicos en la historia de Santiago, Editorial Everest, 1968  
Estévez, José Luis, "50 años de 'Música en Compostela'", El País, 9 August 2007
Henahan, Donal, "Segovia, master guitarist, dies ", North Carolina Times-News (via New York Times News Service), 4 June 1987
La Voz de Galicia, "Los cursos Música en Compostela celebran sus bodas de oro con 125 alumnos en la capilla del Hostal", 5 August 2007

Viz, Adriana, "Enrique Jiménez: “Tenemos la intención de que Música en Compostela dure una semana más”", El Correo Gallego, 16 August 2009

External links
Official website

Classical music in Spain
1958 establishments in Spain